The 2005 All-Big 12 Conference football team consists of American football players chosen as All-Big 12 Conference players for the 2005 Big 12 Conference football season.  The conference recognizes two official All-Big 12 selectors: (1) the Big 12 conference coaches selected separate offensive and defensive units and named first- and second-team players (the "Coaches" team); and (2) a panel of sports writers and broadcasters covering the Big 12 also selected offensive and defensive units and named first- and second-team players (the "Media" team).

Offensive selections

Quarterbacks

 Vince Young, Texas (Coaches-1; Media-1)
 Cody Hodges, Texas Tech (Coaches-2; Media-2)

Running backs

 Taurean Henderson, Texas Tech (Coaches-1; Media-1)
 Adrian Peterson, Oklahoma (Coaches-1; Media-1)
 Jamaal Charles, Texas (Coaches-2; Media-2)
 Cody Ross, Nebraska (Coaches-2)
 Mike Hamilton, Oklahoma State (Media-2)

Centers

 Mark Fenton, Colorado (Coaches-1)
 Scott Stephenson, Iowa State (Media-1)
 Kurt Mann, Nebraska (Media-2)

Guards

 Davin Joseph, Oklahoma (Coaches-1; Media-1)
 Tony Palmer, Missouri (Coaches-1; Media-1)
 Manuel Ramirez, Texas Tech (Coaches-2)
 Kasey Studdard, Texas (Media-2)

Tackles

 Justin Blalock, Texas (Coaches-1; Media-1)
 Jonathan Scott, Texas (Coaches-1; Media-1)
 Will Allen, Texas (Coaches-1; Media-2)
 Jeromey Clary, Kansas State (Coaches-2; Media-2)
 E. J. Whitley, Texas Tech (Coaches-2; Media-2)
 Corey Hilliard, Oklahoma State (Coaches-2)

Tight ends

 Joe Klopfenstein, Colorado (Coaches-1; Media-2)
 David Thomas, Texas (Coaches-2; Media-1)

Receivers

 Jarrett Hicks, Texas Tech (Coaches-1; Media-1)
 Joel Filani, Texas Tech (Coaches-1; Media-1)
 Todd Blythe, Iowa State (Coaches-1; Media-2)
 D'Juan Woods, Oklahoma State (Coaches-2; Media-2)
 Robert Johnson, Texas Tech (Coaches-2)
 Travis Wilson, Oklahoma (Coaches-2)
 Dominique Zeigler, Baylor (Coaches-2)

Defensive selections

Defensive linemen

 Rodrique Wright, Texas (Coaches-1; Media-1)
 Dusty Dvoracek, Oklahoma (Coaches-1; Media-1)
 Charlton Keith, Kansas (Coaches-1; Media-1)
 Nick Leaders, Iowa State (Coaches-1; Media-2)
 Tim Crowder, Texas (Coaches-1)
 Adam Carriker, Nebraska (Coaches-2; Media-1)
 Brent Curvey, Iowa State (Coaches-2; Media-2)
 Keyunta Dawson, Texas Tech (Coaches-2)
 Calvin Thibodeaux, Oklahoma State (Coaches-2)
 Jermial Ashley, Kansas (Coaches-2)
 Frank Okam, Texas (Coaches-2)
 Johnny Jolly, Texas A&M (Media-2)
 Brian Smith, Missouri (Media-2)

Linebackers

 Rufus Alexander, Oklahoma (Coaches-1; Media-1)
 Nick Reid, Kansas (Coaches-1; Media-1)
 Aaron Harris, Texas (Coaches-1; Media-1)
Tim Dobbins, Iowa State (Coaches-2; Media-1)
 Justin Warren, Texas A&M (Coaches-2; Media-2)
 Brian Iwuh, Colorado (Coaches-2)
 Clint Ingram, Oklahoma (Coaches-2)
 Corey McKeon, Nebraska (Media-2)
 Jamar Ransom, Oklahoma State (Media-2)
 Thaddaeus Washington, Colorado (Media-2)

Defensive backs

 Michael Huff, Texas (Coaches-1; Media-1)
 Dwayne Slay, Texas Tech (Coaches-1; Media-1)
 Cedric Griffin, Texas (Coaches-1; Media-1)
 Willie Andrews, Baylor (Coaches-1
 LaMarcus Hicks, Iowa State (Coaches-1; Media-2)
 Maurice Lane, Baylor (Media-1)
 Charles Gordon, Kansas (Coaches-2)
 Chijioke Onyenegecha, Oklahoma (Coaches-2)
 Daniel Bullocks, Nebraska (Coaches-2; Media-2)
 Vincent Meeks, Texas Tech (Coaches-2)
 Steve Paris, Iowa State (Coaches-2)
 Michael Griffin, Texas (Media-2)
 C. J. Wilson, Baylor (Media-2)

Special teams

Kickers

 Mason Crosby, Colorado (Coaches-1; Media-1)
 Todd Pregram, Texas A&M (Coaches-2)
 Jordan Congdon, Nebraska (Media-2)

Punters

 John Torp, Colorado (Coaches-1; Media-2)
 Daniel Sepulveda, Baylor (Coaches-2; Media-1)

All-purpose / Return specialists

 Charles Gordon, Kansas (Coaches-1; Media-2)
 Stephone Robinson, Colorado (Coaches-2)
 Brad Smith, Missouri (Media-1)

Key
Bold = selected as a first-team player by both the coaches and media panel

Coaches = selected by Big 12 Conference coaches

Media = selected by a media panel

See also
2005 College Football All-America Team

References

All-Big 12 Conference
All-Big 12 Conference football teams